Argillaceous schist is metamorphic rock which exhibits fine laminations of clay materials. Its protolith is argillite.

References

See also
Pelite

Schist